The Gilbert M. Simmons Memorial Library is located in Kenosha, Wisconsin, United States, and is a location of the Kenosha Public Library (KPL). KPL consists of 4 locations, an Outreach department, and is a member of both the Kenosha County Library System (KCLS) and the SHARE Consortium. The Simmons Memorial Library was added to the National Register of Historic Places in 1974, and was the first formal location for KPL. KPL was named the Power of Libraries Award Winner in 2018, Wisconsin Library Association's 2020 Library of the Year, and a finalist for the National Medal for Museum and Library Service in 2021.

History

The Gilbert M. Simmons Memorial Library was the first public building in the City Park district in Kenosha, Wisconsin. Upon its completion, City Park became known as Library Park. Daniel Burnham designed the Neoclassical library while Ossian Cole Simonds developed the landscaping plan. Former Kenosha mayor Zalmon G. Simmons donated $150,000 for the building's construction on the condition that it be named in honor for his deceased son. The city agreed, and the library opened to the public on May 30, 1900. As the city's first public library building, Gilbert M. Simmons Memorial Library greatly increased the volumes of literature available to the citizens of Kenosha. By the mid-1910s, the library had 124,368 volumes and sought to expand with a branch library.

The building was recognized by the National Park Service with a listing on the National Register of Historic Places on December 17, 1974. When the Library Park Historic District was created in 1988, the library was listed as a contributing property.

There are rumors of the library being haunted by a female ghost and a legend of a secret tomb in the library.

Governance
The Kenosha Public Library is governed by a Board of Trustees appointed by the Mayor of Kenosha and approved by the City Council. The Board is composed of nine citizen members, eight City of Kenosha residents and one representative of the Kenosha Unified School District.

Services

Collections
The Simmons Library's collection count is over 13,000 items, has access to over 275,000 items via the other Kenosha Public Library locations, and over 2 million items through the partnership with libraries in Racine County, Walworth County, and Rock County.

Digital collections
Kenosha Public Library cardholders can digitally borrow books, music and movies since 2017 by creating an account on the online platform Hoopla. The Library also offers audiobook, e-book, and eMagazine services, including OverDrive eBooks & eAudiobooks, TeachingBooks Library, Ebsco eBooks, and Online tutoring, delivered via the library's website.

Technology
The Simmons Library technology services include public access computers and free wireless internet access throughout the library. The Library provides access to e-books, music, movies, and other electronic collections. The library provides access to a color printer & copier for a fee. Printing at the library uses a secure release station to help protect patron privacy, with a secondary printer located in the Children's Room. A fax machine is also available for public use, with a 3D printer available by request from the Southwest Library. The library operates a Book Break telephone hotline during the COVID-19 pandemic, which reads stories to children.

The library system uses RFID pads on all library materials where users only need to place the book on a table and check out occurs without scanning.

See also
 Kenosha, Wisconsin
 Library Park Historic District (Kenosha, Wisconsin)

References

External links

Kenosha County Library System

Library buildings completed in 1900
1900s establishments in Wisconsin
Libraries on the National Register of Historic Places in Wisconsin
Public libraries in Wisconsin
Buildings and structures in Kenosha, Wisconsin
Neoclassical architecture in Wisconsin
Education in Kenosha, Wisconsin
Historic district contributing properties in Wisconsin
National Register of Historic Places in Kenosha County, Wisconsin